The 2004 Illinois Fighting Illini football team represented the University of Illinois at Urbana–Champaign in the 2004 NCAA Division I-A football season. They participated as members of the Big Ten Conference. Their home games were played at Memorial Stadium in Champaign, Illinois. The team's head coach was Ron Turner, who was in his eighth season with the Illini and was fired at the conclusion of the season.  Illinois had a record of 3–8.

Schedule

Roster

References

Illinois
Illinois Fighting Illini football seasons
Illinois Fighting Illini football